This is a list of It's Showtime champions.

Last champions

It's Showtime Heavyweight Championship

It's Showtime 95MAX Championship

It's Showtime 85MAX Championship

It's Showtime 77MAX Championship

It's Showtime 73MAX Championship

It's Showtime 69MAX Championship

It's Showtime 65MAX Championship

It's Showtime 61MAX Championship

It's Showtime 75MAX Trophy champions

It's Showtime 75MAX Trophy preliminary champions

It's Showtime Fast & Furious 70MAX champions

It's Showtime 70MAX MMA Championship

See also
 List of It's Showtime (kickboxing) events
 List of kickboxers

References

Champions
K-1 champions
It's Showtime Champions